Norway was represented by Anita Thallaug, with the song "Solhverv", at the 1963 Eurovision Song Contest, which took place on 23 March in London. The song was chosen as the Norwegian entry at the Melodi Grand Prix on 10 February.

Thallaug had not originally performed "Solhverv" in MGP, but was asked to become Norway's representative when the winning performer, Nora Brockstedt, pulled out of a third Eurovision appearance, citing a scheduling conflict with other previously-arranged engagements. It was widely rumoured however that a more plausible explanation was that Brockstedt considered "Solhverv" a substandard song, unlikely to do well in the contest, and did not wish to risk damaging her reputation with a poor result after her two earlier Eurovision performances had gained relatively respectable placings.

Norway's participation in the 1963 contest also became mired in scandal when it was alleged that on the night of the contest the Norwegian jury had publicly changed their votes in order to deliver victory to Denmark and deny Switzerland a rightful win.

Before Eurovision

Melodi Grand Prix 1963
The MGP was held at the studios of the Norwegian Broadcasting Corporation in Oslo, hosted by Odd Grythe. Five songs took part in the final with each song sung twice by different singers, once with a small combo and once with a full orchestra. The winning song was chosen by voting from ten regional juries.

At Eurovision 
On the night of the final Thallaug performed 5th in the running order, following Austria and preceding Italy. Each national jury awarded 5-4-3-2-1 to its top five songs, and whatever reservations Brockstedt may have had about "Solhverv" proved justified, as at the close of voting the song had failed to pick up any points at all, placing Norway joint last (along with Finland, the Netherlands and Sweden who had been similarly snubbed) of the 16 entries. The Norwegian jury awarded its 5 points to the United Kingdom, however the circumstances surrounding the announcement of the Norwegian votes caused a huge controversy as it was suggested that they had altered their votes in order to change the outcome of the contest (see Denmark in the Eurovision Song Contest 1963).

Voting 
Norway did not receive any points at the 1963 Eurovision Song Contest.

References 

1963
Countries in the Eurovision Song Contest 1963
1963
Eurovision
Eurovision